Jean-Louis Schneiter (17 January 1933 – 7 September 2016) was a French politician. He served as a member of the National Assembly from 1978 to 1981, representing Marne. He served as the mayor of Reims from 1999 to 2008.

References

1933 births
2016 deaths
Politicians from Reims
Mayors of places in Grand Est
Union for French Democracy politicians
Deputies of the 6th National Assembly of the French Fifth Republic
Chevaliers of the Légion d'honneur